Gregory Wayne "Cadillac" Anderson (born June 22, 1964) is an American former professional basketball player.

College career 

He attended and played collegiate basketball at the University of Houston, where he was one of the last original members of the famed Phi Slama Jama “fraternity”. He competed in the 1984 Final Four in Seattle while at Houston.

Professional career 
A 6'10" power forward/center, Anderson was selected 23rd overall by the San Antonio Spurs in the 1987 NBA draft. In 1988, he participated in the NBA Slam Dunk Contest where he finished in sixth place. The 1988–89 season, spent with the Spurs, was arguably his most productive, averaging 13.7 points and 8.2 rebounds per game.

In 1989, Anderson was traded to the Bucks along with Alvin Robertson as part of the deal that sent all-star Terry Cummings to the Spurs. On January 8, 1990, Anderson scored a tenure high 28 points along with grabbing 12 rebounds in a 126-113 win over the Charlotte Hornets.

In January 1991, Anderson was traded twice in one week, eventually arriving to Denver as part of the multi-team trade that saw Croatian superstar Drazen Petrovic move from Portland to New Jersey. In 1991–92, with the Nuggets, he averaged 11.5 points and a career-best 11.5 rebounds per game.

Anderson spent one year playing in the Italian Lega Basket Serie A with Phonola Caserta in 1992–93, leading the league in rebounding.

Anderson then returned to the NBA, playing mostly as a role player for the Pistons, Hawks, and Spurs again, before finishing his career in Argentina playing for Belgrano de San Nicolás in 2000.

Personal life 
As a freshman at the University of Houston, Anderson's mode of transportation around campus was a 10-speed bicycle – an odd sight for someone at 6-foot-10. A friend said the bike "was (Greg's) Cadillac", and the nickname stuck from there.

In October 1998, Anderson pleaded guilty to one count of possession of cocaine with intent to distribute in Biloxi, Mississippi and was sentenced to five months in prison.

NBA career statistics

Regular season 

|-
| style="text-align:left;"| 
| style="text-align:left;"|San Antonio
| 82 || 45 || 24.2 || .501 || .200 || .604 || 6.3 || 1.0 || 0.7 || 1.5 || 11.7
|-
| style="text-align:left;"| 
| style="text-align:left;"|San Antonio
| 82 || 56 || 29.3 || .503 || .000 || .514 || 8.2 || 0.7 || 1.2 || 1.3 || 13.7
|-
| style="text-align:left;"| 
| style="text-align:left;"|Milwaukee
| 60 || 28 || 21.5 || .507 || – || .535 || 6.2 || 0.4 || 0.5 || 0.9 || 8.8
|-
| style="text-align:left;"| 
| style="text-align:left;"|Milwaukee
| 26 || 0 || 9.5 || .370 || .000 || .571 || 2.9 || 0.1 || 0.3 || 0.3 || 2.7
|-
| style="text-align:left;"| 
| style="text-align:left;"|New Jersey
| 1 || 0 || 18.0 || 1.000 || – || –|| 6.0 || 1.0 || 2.0 || 0.0 || 8.0
|-
| style="text-align:left;"| 
| style="text-align:left;"|Denver
| 41 || 2 || 16.1 || .440 || – || .506 || 5.8 || 0.3 || 0.6 || 0.9 || 5.2
|-
| style="text-align:left;"| 
| style="text-align:left;"|Denver
| 82 || 82 || 34.1 || .456 || .000 || .623 || 11.5 || 1.0 || 1.1 || 0.8 || 11.5
|-
| style="text-align:left;"| 
| style="text-align:left;"|Detroit
| 77 || 47 || 21.1 || .543 || .333 || .571 || 7.4 || 0.7 || 0.7 || 0.9 || 6.4
|-
| style="text-align:left;"| 
| style="text-align:left;"|Atlanta
| 51 || 0 || 12.2 || .548 || – || .479 || 3.7 || 0.3 || 0.5 || 0.6 || 2.9
|-
| style="text-align:left;"| 
| style="text-align:left;"|San Antonio
| 46 || 7 || 7.5 || .511 || .000 || .240 || 2.2 || 0.2 || 0.2 || 0.5 || 1.2
|-
| style="text-align:left;"| 
| style="text-align:left;"|San Antonio
| 82 || 48 || 20.2 || .496 || .000 || .667 || 5.5 || 0.4 || 0.8 || 0.8 || 3.9
|-
| style="text-align:left;"| 
| style="text-align:left;"|Atlanta
| 50 || 0 || 8.0 || .444 || .000 || .390 || 2.4 || 0.3 || 0.4 || 0.2 || 1.8
|- class="sortbottom"
| style="text-align:center;" colspan="2"| Career
| 680 || 315 || 20.6 || .492 || .087 || .557 || 6.2 || 0.6 || 0.7 || 0.9 || 7.3

Playoffs 

|-
|style="text-align:left;"|1988
| style="text-align:left;"|San Antonio
|3||3||31.7||.472||–||.444||7.0||1.0||0.7||1.3||12.7
|-
|style="text-align:left;"|1990
| style="text-align:left;"|Milwaukee
|4||0||25.3||.684||–||.500||6.0||0.0||0.3||1.0||8.3
|-
|style="text-align:left;"|1995
| style="text-align:left;"|Atlanta
|3||0||13.0||.200||–||.750||4.3||0.7||0.7||0.7||1.7
|-
|style="text-align:left;"|1996
| style="text-align:left;"|San Antonio
|6||0||5.7||.000||–||.500||1.5||0.0||0.3||0.2||0.2
|-
|style="text-align:left;"|1998
| style="text-align:left;"|Atlanta
|1||0||4.0||–||–||.000||2.0||0.0||0.0||1.0||0.0
|- class="sortbottom"
| style="text-align:center;" colspan="2"| Career
| 17 || 3 || 16.1 || .477 || – || .484 || 4.1 || 0.3 || 0.4 || 0.7 || 4.5

References

External links 

Lega Basket Serie A profile Retrieved June 15, 2015 

1964 births
Living people
African-American basketball players
American drug traffickers
American expatriate basketball people in Argentina
American expatriate basketball people in Italy
American men's basketball players
American people convicted of drug offenses
American sportspeople convicted of crimes
Atlanta Hawks players
Basketball players from Houston
Centers (basketball)
Denver Nuggets players
Detroit Pistons players
Harlem Globetrotters players
Houston Cougars men's basketball players
Juvecaserta Basket players
Lega Basket Serie A players
Milwaukee Bucks players
New Jersey Nets players
Power forwards (basketball)
San Antonio Spurs draft picks
San Antonio Spurs players
21st-century African-American people
20th-century African-American sportspeople